is a railway station on the Aizu Railway Aizu Line in the city of Aizuwakamatsu, Fukushima Prefecture, Japan, operated by the Aizu Railway..

Lines

Station layout
Amaya Station has one side platform serving a single bi-directional track. There is no station building, but only a shelter by the platform. The station is unattended.

Adjacent stations

History
Amaya Station opened on October 7, 1999.

Surrounding area

See also
 List of railway stations in Japan

External links

 Aizu Railway Station information 

Railway stations in Fukushima Prefecture
Aizu Line
Railway stations in Japan opened in 1999
Aizuwakamatsu